Vitalia Anatolyevna Diatchenko (born 2 August 1990) is a Russian professional tennis player. Her career-high singles ranking is world No. 71, achieved on 17 November 2014. On 21 February 2011, she peaked at No. 60 in the doubles rankings.

Career

2009: Grand Slam debut
Diatchenko's first Grand Slam tournament was Roland Garros, where she 2009 qualified for the main draw. In the tournament, she upset world No. 75 player, Mathilde Johansson, before she lost to then-world No. 1, Dinara Safina.

In 2009, she lost the finals of Pattaya Open along with Yulia Beygelzimer to opponents Tamarine Tanasugarn and Yaroslava Shvedova, in straight sets, and of Tashkent Open with Ekaterina Dzehalevich to Tatiana Poutchek and Olga Govortsova, in three sets.

2010
In 2010, she lost the final of the Portugal Open with Aurélie Védy to opponents Anabel Medina Garrigues and Sorana Cîrstea.

At the French Open, she was beaten in the third round of qualifying by Misaki Doi. At the Wimbledon Championships qualifying, she lost in the second round to Monica Niculescu in two sets.
Diatchenko also participated in events on the ITF Circuit: she won the tournament in Darmstadt, Germany; in the final, she beat eighth seeded German player Julia Schruff.

Then she lost her fourth WTA International doubles final with partner Tatiana Poutchek, at Copenhagen to German pair Anna-Lena Grönefeld/Julia Görges.

2011: Top 60 debut in doubles, injury and hiatus

Vitalia lost in the qualifying at Melbourne in the second round to Sania Mirza in three sets. She then entered the qualifying at Dubai but lost in the first round to Anastasia Pavlyuchenkova, after being 3–1 ahead in the second set.

Diatchenko qualified for the Wimbledon Championships for the first time in her career by defeating Julia Glushko, Maria Elena Camerin and Stéphanie Dubois for her first main draw in a Grand Slam tournament. In the first round, she was defeated by 25th seed Daniela Hantuchová in three sets. Vitalia was also defeated in the first round of the women's doubles with compatriot Maria Kondratieva, by Vera Dushevina and Ekaterina Makarova.

Seeded first at the GB Pro-Series Foxhills, she defeated fifth seed Marta Sirotkina in the quarterfinals. In her semifinal match, she retired whilst trailing 2–6, 0–2 to Johanna Konta.

On July 30, Diatchenko won the biggest singles title of her career so far at the President's Cup, an $100k tournament held in Astana. She beat sixth seed Akgul Amanmuradova in the final. She also won the women's doubles title with Galina Voskoboeva. They defeated Amanmuradova and Alexandra Panova in the final, also in two sets.

Vitalia participated in the Tatarstan Open in singles and doubles. Alexandra Panova was her doubles partner. Diatchenko was seeded fifth in the singles and first in the doubles. In the first round of the singles, she defeated Eugeniya Pashkova, in the second round Pemra Özgen, and in the quarterfinals Valentyna Ivakhnenko, all in straight sets. In the semifinals, Vitalia retired against wildcard and eventual champion, Yulia Putintseva, after suffering an ankle injury. In the doubles, after winning their first round and quarterfinal matches, Vitalia and Alexandra upset third seeds Evgeniya Rodina and Valeria Solovyeva in the semifinals. Due to suffering an injury in the semifinals of the singles, Vitalia was unable to play the doubles final.

At the US Open, she beat Laura Siegemund in the first round of the qualifying stages, Sesil Karatantcheva also in two sets, and in the final round Marta Domachowska in three for a place in the main draw. It was the first time she qualified for the main draw of the US Open. In the first round, she was defeated by Zheng Jie.

In the Tashkent Open, she fought past Olga Govortsova in three sets before she lost to Alla Kudryavtseva in the second round. In the doubles, Vitalia and her partner Eleni Daniilidou beat Lyudmyla Kichenok and Nadiya Kichenok in the final, in straight sets. This was Vitalia's first time to win a WTA Tour doubles title in her career.

She qualified for the Ladies Linz but lost in the first round to Ksenia Pervak.

Playing doubles at the Kremlin Cup, Vitalia suffered a knee injury which ruled her out from playing tennis for six months.

2014: First WTA 125 title and career-high singles ranking
After a brief appearance on the WTA Tour and a return to the ITF Circuit, she played her first notable game for years at the Kremlin Cup, where the 140-ranked Vitalia eliminated No. 14, Dominika Cibulková, in the round of 16, until being knocked down by Anastasia Pavlyuchenkova. Diatchenko completed the year by winning her first WTA 125 singles title at Taipei.

2018: Wimbledon 3rd round
In the first round of Wimbledon, she defeated former world No. 1, Maria Sharapova (ranked 22nd at the time). Diatchenko then defeated Sofia Kenin, advancing to the third round of a major tournament for the first time but Jeļena Ostapenko defeated her in straight sets.

Performance timelines

Only main-draw results in WTA Tour, Grand Slam tournaments, Fed Cup/Billie Jean King Cup and Olympic Games are included in win–loss records.

Singles
Current after the 2023 Australian Open.

Doubles

WTA career finals

Doubles: 7 (1 title, 6 runner-ups)

WTA Challenger finals

Singles: 3 (3 titles)

Doubles: 1 (runner-up)

ITF Circuit finals

Singles: 27 (21 titles, 6 runner–ups)

Doubles: 18 (13 titles, 5 runner–ups)

Notes

References

External links

 
 
 

1990 births
Living people
Russian female tennis players
Universiade medalists in tennis
Tennis players from Moscow
Sportspeople from Sochi
Universiade gold medalists for Russia
Medalists at the 2009 Summer Universiade